Burcin is a commune in the Isère department in southeastern France.

Geography
The Bourbre has its source in the commune and forms part of its western border.

Population

See also
Communes of the Isère department

References

Communes of Isère
Isère communes articles needing translation from French Wikipedia